The Mayor of Woodbridge Township is the official head and chief executive officer of Woodbridge Township in Middlesex County, New Jersey, U.S. The mayor serves a four-year term. On June 29, 2006, incumbent mayor Frank Pelzman died of cancer, leading to the appointment of state senator Joe Vitale as interim mayor. Former state treasurer John McCormac was won a special election for the office in November 2006 and has since been reelected in 2007, 2011, 2015, and 2019.

List
Walter Zirpolo (D) January 1, 1962 to April 11, 1967
Ralph Barone (D), April 11, 1967 to December 31, 1971
John J. Cassidy (R), January 1, 1972 to December 31, 1979
Joseph DeMarino (D), January 1, 1980 to December 31, 1983
Philip M. Cerria (R), January 1, 1984 to December 31, 1987
Joseph DeMarino (D), January 1, 1988 to December 31, 1992
Jim McGreevey (D), January 1, 1992 to January 15, 2002
Frank Pelzman (D), January 17, 2002 to June 29, 2006
Joe Vitale (D), Interim Mayor, July 25, 2006 to November 13, 2006
John McCormac (D), November 13, 2006 to present

References

External links
 Woodbridge Township, NJ